Nga Awa Purua, also known as Rotokawa II, is a geothermal power station located near Taupo in New Zealand. The project was developed by Mighty River Power (now Mercury Energy). Nga Awa Purua is New Zealand's second largest geothermal power station and the steam turbine is the largest geothermal turbine in the world.

The power station is a joint venture between Mercury Energy (75%) and the Tauhara North No 2 Trust (25%), who represent about 800 owners affiliated to Ngati Tahu.  The $430 million project first generated electricity on 18 January 2010, and was officially opened by Prime Minister John Key on 15 May 2010.

The Rotokawa Power Station is situated close by.

See also 

 List of power stations in New Zealand

References 

Geothermal power stations in New Zealand
Buildings and structures in the Taupo District
Ngāti Tahu